Jean-Gaspard-Félix Laché Ravaisson-Mollien (23 October 1813 – 18 May 1900) was a French philosopher, 'perhaps France's most influential philosopher in the second half of the nineteenth century'. He was originally and remains more commonly known as Félix Ravaisson. 

His 'seminal' 'key' work was De l’habitude (1838), translated in English as Of Habit. Ravaisson's philosophy is in the tradition of French Spiritualism, which was initiated by Pierre Maine de Biran (1766 – 1824) with the essay "The Influence of Habit on the Faculty of Thinking" (1802). However, Ravaisson developed his doctrine as what he called ‘spiritualist realism’ and ‘spiritualist positivism’, and - according to Ravaisson scholar Mark Sinclair - can be thought of as founding 'the school of contingency'. His most well known and influential successor was Henri Bergson, with whom the tradition can be seen to end during the 1930s; although the 'lineage' of this 'philosophy of life' can be seen to return in the late twentieth century with Gilles Deleuze. Ravaisson never worked in the French state university system, in his late 20s declining a position at the University of Rennes. In 1838 he was employed as the principle private secretary to the Minister of Public Instruction, going on to secure high-ranking positions such as Inspector General of Libraries, and then the Curator of Classical Antiquities at the Louvre. Later in his life he was appointed as the President of the Jury of the Aggregation of philosophy in France, 'a position of considerable influence'. Ravaisson, was not only a philosopher, classicist, archivist, and educational administrator, but also a painter exhibiting under the name Laché.

Biography

Ravaisson was born at Namur. After a successful course of study at the Collège Rollin, he went to Munich in autumn 1839, where he attended the lectures of Schelling, and took his degree in philosophy in 1836. In the following year he published the first volume of his famous work Essai sur la métaphysique d'Aristote ("Essay on the Metaphysics of Aristotle"), to which in 1846 he added a supplementary volume. This work not only criticizes and comments on the theories of Aristotle and the Peripatetics, but also develops from them a modern philosophical system.

In 1838 he received his doctorate, his thesis entitled "De l'habitude" ("On Habit"), which was to become a classic text (a metaphysical 'poem' on nature in general apprehended through an intuitive analysis of acquired habit as a particular manifestation of its essential being, much admired by Bergson and Heidegger), and became professor of philosophy at Rennes. From 1840 he was inspector-general of public libraries, and in 1860 became inspector-general in the department of higher education. He was also a member of the Academy of Moral and Political Sciences, and curator of the Department of Antiquities at the Louvre (from 1870). He died in Paris in 1900.

Philosophical work

In philosophy, he was one of the school of Victor Cousin, with whom he was at issue in many important points. The act of consciousness, according to him, is the basis of all knowledge. Acts of consciousness are manifestations of will, which is the motive and creative power of the intellectual life. The idea of God is a cumulative intuition given by all the various faculties of the mind, in its observation of harmony in nature and in man. This theory had considerable influence on speculative philosophy in France during the later years of the 19th century.

Bibliography

Ravaisson's 'complete' 'three major' philosophical works are: Essai sur la métaphysique d’Aristote [Vol. 1 & Vol. 2] (1837 and 1846); De l’habitude (On Habit, 1838); and Rapport sur la philosophie en France au XIXeme siècle (1867). Ravaisson also produced a number of other 'noteworthy essays' such as "La Philosophie contemporaine" ("Contemporary Philosophy", 1840); "La Philosophie de Pascale" ("Pascal’s Philosophy", 1887), and "Métaphysique et Morale" ("Metaphysics and Morals", 1893). Upon his death he also 'left unfinished fragments of a major work, which were published posthumously', first as "Testament philosophique" in Revue de métaphysique et de morale ("Philosophical Testament", 1901), then later in extended form as Testament philosophique (Philosophical Testament, 1933).

References

Notes

Sources
Primary

Sinclair, Mark. Being Inclined: Félix Ravaisson’s Philosophy of Habit (Oxford: Oxford University Press, 2019)

Secondary

Carlisle, Clare. "Between Freedom and Necessity: Félix Ravaisson on Habit and the Moral Life", in Inquiry (43/2: 2010), pp. 123–45
Carlisle, Clare and Mark Sinclair. "Editors’ Introduction" and "Editors’ Commentary" in Félix Ravaisson Of Habit, translation, introduction, and commentary by Clare Carlisle and Mark Sinclair (London/New York: Continuum, 2008), pp. 1-21; 78-114 
 
Grosz, Elizabeth. "Habit Today: Ravaisson, Bergson, Deleuze and Us", in Body and Society (19/2–3: 2013), pp. 217–39
Malabou, Catherine. "Addiction and Grace: Preface to Félix Ravaisson’s Of Habit" in Félix Ravaisson Of Habit, translation, introduction, and commentary by Clare Carlisle and Mark Sinclair (London/New York: Continuum, 2008), pp. vii-xx 
Sinclair, Mark. "Introduction" in Félix Ravaisson: Selected Essays, edited by Mark Sinclair; translated by Jeremy Dunham, Adi Efal, Mark Sinclair, Tullio Viola (London: Bloomsbury, 2016), pp. 1-29

1813 births
1900 deaths
19th-century French educators
19th-century French essayists
19th-century French male writers
19th-century French painters
19th-century French philosophers
Action theorists
Aristotelian philosophers
Classicism
Commentators on Aristotle
French consciousness researchers and theorists
Continental philosophers
Epistemologists
French archaeologists
French art historians
French classical scholars
French educators
French essayists
French ethicists
French male non-fiction writers
French male painters
Historians of philosophy
Metaphysicians
Ontologists
People from Namur (city)
Philosophers of art
Philosophers of culture
Philosophers of education
Philosophers of history
Philosophers of mind
Philosophers of psychology
Philosophers of social science
Philosophy academics